Unearthed, the first album composed by E.S. Posthumus, was originally made available for purchase online through the CD Baby website in November 2001. It became the third-biggest selling album in CDBaby's history. The success of the album prompted the wide re-release to retail in May 2005 through Wigshop and 33rd Street Records/Bayside Distribution.

A key piece to the distinctive sound of the music comes from working with the Northwest Sinfonia. In an interview with SoundtrackNet, the band said "we wanted the chance to blow an ungodly sum of cash working with a big orchestra". Other musicians performing on this CD include Pedro Eustache, Michael Landau, Matt Laug, Lance Morrison, Davy Spillane and Efrain Toro.

The painting used in the cover of the album is The Inspiration of Saint Matthew by Italian Baroque painter Caravaggio.

Track listing
In keeping with the theme of "all things past", each of the thirteen tracks on the album is named after an ancient city, most of which have been abandoned or destroyed, though Cuzco, Nara, Isfahan, and Estremoz still survive to this day.

Personnel

E.S. Posthumus 
 Helmut Vonlichten – composing, recording, mixing, arranging
 Franz Vonlichten – composing, recording, mixing, arranging

Additional musicians 

 Pedro Eustache – reeds, woodwind
 Michael Landau - guitar
 Matt Laug – drum machine
 Lance Morrison – bass guitar
 Seattle Choral Company – vocals
 Davy Spillane – low whistle, uilleann pipes
 Efrain Toro - percussion

Technical personnel 

 Brian Gardner – mastering
 David Sabee – contractor
 Woody Woodruff – engineering
 Erich Estereicher – art direction
 Kevin Weel – art direction

Media usage
Many tracks from Unearthed have been featured in various movie trailers and television shows. They have been used in the trailers for movies due to their escalating structure, which makes them well-suited for the dramatic montages building towards the credits in the aforementioned trailers.

An excerpt from the track "Nara" is used as the main theme for the CBS television show Cold Case. A vocal rise performed by a female solo singer (Elise Morris) leads into the opening title, where one of the verses of "Nara" is then played for the remainder of the sequence, concluding with a short melody from a woodwind instrument. At the time Executive Producer Jerry Bruckheimer chose the song to be used in the show, he had never actually met the Vonlichten brothers in person. Additionally, Michael A. Levine, a musical composer for television shows and advertisements, created a reworked version of "Nara" that is played during the show's closing credits as provided by the studio (though not as shown on CBS). The track was also featured in the animation for the presentation of the design for the Beijing WaterCube by the firm architectural LAVA.

The track "Ebla" was also used as the main menu music for the 2008 racing video game Ferrari Challenge: Trofeo Pirelli.

One track from the Unearthed album has also been used in the BBC TV series Top Gear and its stage show, Top Gear Live.

The following list provides details on the movie trailers that have used tracks from the Unearthed album:

2001
 Planet of the Apes - "Menouthis" and "Pompeii" 
 Spy Game - "Pompeii"
 The Affair of the Necklace - "Harappa"

2002
 Antwone Fisher - "Nara"
 Minority Report - "Tikal"
 Spider-Man - "Pompeii" and "Nineveh"
 The Recruit - "Menouthis"
 The Time Machine - "Tikal"
 Tuck Everlasting - "Cuzco"
 The Lord of the Rings: The Two Towers - "Nara"
 Unfaithful - "Nara"
 XXX - "Harappa" and "Tikal"

2003
 Lara Croft Tomb Raider: The Angel of Darkness - "Nara"
 Cold Case - "Nara"
 Daredevil - "Lepcis Magna" and "Tikal"
 Lara Croft Tomb Raider: The Cradle of Life - "Menouthis"
 Pirates of the Caribbean: The Curse of the Black Pearl - "Tikal"
 The Matrix Reloaded - "Ebla"

2004
 Catwoman - "Pompeii"
 National Treasure - "Menouthis" and "Nara"
 Team America: World Police - "Harappa" and "Tikal"
 The Clearing - "Nara"
 Vanity Fair - "Nara"

2005
 Two for the Money - "Nineveh"
 XXX: State of the Union - "Harappa"

2006
Curse of the Golden Flower - "Pompeii"
Breaking and Entering - "Nara"
The Last King of Scotland - "Tikal"

2007
Partition - "Nara"
Pirates of the Caribbean: At World's End - "Nineveh"
The Irony of Fate 2 - "Nara"
Top Gear: Polar Special
The Tudors - "Nara" (Opening theme, season 1)

2008
The Other Boleyn Girl - "Nara"

2010
The Drawn Together Movie: The Movie! - "Tikal"

2012
The Hunger Games - "Nara"

2013
Prosecuting Casey Anthony - "Nara"

References

2001 debut albums
E.S. Posthumus albums